This is a list of Chinese Catholics in communion with Rome. It does not include members of the Chinese Patriotic Catholic Association, unless they are also recognized by the Holy See, but for cultural reasons does include Taiwanese persons.

Catholics of dynastic China 
This concerns those who lived most or all of their life before the Xinhai Revolution.
Martyr Saints of China - Although a few are from the Republican period.
The Three Pillars of Chinese Catholicism: Xu Guangqi, Lǐ Zhīzǎo, and Yáng Tíngyú.
Jiao Bingzhen - Painter and astronomer.
Wu Li - Landscape painter, poet, and Jesuit.
Ma Xiangbo - Jesuit, scholar, and educator.
Li Yingshi - A Ming Chinese military officer and mathematician.
Empress Dowager Ma - Mother of Yongli Emperor
Empress Xiaoguang - Empress of
Princess Der Ling - author of several memoirs, books, and magazine articles
Charles Yu Hsingling - Railway engineer and diplomat to France
Lucy Yi Zhenmei - Martyr saint

Catholics of modern China

Clergy

Cardinals 
Ignatius Kung Pin-Mei - A bishop of the Roman Catholic Diocese of Shanghai who became a Cardinal in pectore
Thomas Tien Ken-sin - He was elevated to Cardinal Priest of Santa Maria in Via by Pope Pius XII in the consistory of February 18, 1946.
John Tong Hon - Titular Archpriest of the church of Regina Apostolorum in Rome.
John Wu - Associated to the Roman Catholic Diocese of Hong Kong.
Paul Yü Pin - Previously an archbishop of Nanking.
Joseph Zen - He had been the sixth bishop of the Roman Catholic Diocese of Hong Kong.

Archbishops and bishops 
Han Dingxiang - An underground bishop of Yongnian detained for much of his ministry for his loyalty to the Vatican as opposed to the Chinese government-controlled Roman Catholic Church.
Matthew Kia Yen-wen - An archbishop emeritus of Taipei,
Joseph Meng Ziwen - A bishop who spent time in a labor camp, was also recognized by the government as a priest of the Chinese Patriotic Catholic Association.
John Chen Shi-zhong - A bishop of the Roman Catholic Diocese of Suifu.
Dominic Tang - Last archbishop of the Roman Catholic Archdiocese of Guangzhou to be recognized by the Holy See.
Leon Yao Liang - A bishop of the Roman Catholic Diocese of Xiwanzi.
Peter Zhang Bairen - An unofficial bishop of the Roman Catholic Diocese of Hanyang.

Priests 
Beda Chang - Jesuit killed by the Communists.
Nicholas Kao Se Tseien - Hong Kong priest known for his longevity.
Lou Tseng-Tsiang - Convert who attended the Paris Peace Conference of 1919 and later became a Benedictine priest.
Lawrence Zhang Wen-Chang - An Apostolic Administrator sent to the Laogai system by the People's Republic of China.

Nuns 

 Beatrice Leung - Sister of the Precious Blood of Hong Kong, and Professor at Wenzao Ursuline University of Languages.

Entertainers

Musicians 
James Wong - Singer-songwriter, actor, columnist, and film director.

Politicians 
Chan Kwok-keung - Former Member of the Legislative Council of Hong Kong.
Paul Chan - Previous head of the New Macau Association.
Audrey Eu - Former Member of the Legislative Council of Hong Kong.
Carrie Lam - Current Chief Executive of Hong Kong
Martin Lee - Founding chairman of the Democratic Party of Hong Kong. 
Antonio Ng - Member of the Legislative Assembly of Macau.
Donald Tsang - The second Chief Executive and President of the Executive Council of Hong Kong from 2005 to 2012.
John Tsang - Former Financial Secretary of Hong Kong.

Writers 
Su Xuelin - Novelist and scholar whose autobiographical Ji Xin (Heart of the Thorn Bush, 1929) discusses her conversion to Catholicism.
John C. H. Wu - Diplomat, jurist, and writer of works such as From Confucianism to Catholicism and Chinese Humanism and Christian spirituality.

References 

 
Chinese
Catholics